The Violin Sonata No. 5 in F major, Op. 24, is a four movement work for violin and piano by Ludwig van Beethoven. It was first published in 1801.  The work is commonly known as the Spring Sonata (Frühlingssonate), although the name "Spring" was apparently given to it after Beethoven's death.  The sonata was dedicated to Count Moritz von Fries, a patron to whom Beethoven also dedicated two other works of the same year—the String Quintet in C major, Op. 29 and the Violin Sonata No. 4—as well as his later Symphony No. 7 in A major.

Origin
Beethoven initially intended to pair this work with his Violin Sonata No. 4, Opus 23, and the two sonatas complement each other in both key and character.  However, the two were not published together and thus have different opus numbers. The reason for the separation is unknown.

Structure 
The work is in four movements:

The entire sonata takes approximately 22 minutes to perform.

See also
Violin Sonata in A major (Beethoven)

References
Notes

Sources

External links

Performance of Violin Sonata No. 5 by Corey Cerovsek (violin) and Paavali Jumppanen (piano) from the Isabella Stewart Gardner Museum

Violin Sonata 05
1801 compositions
Compositions in F major
Music with dedications
Music dedicated to nobility or royalty